Daniel Helm (born April 20, 1995) is an American football tight end for the Memphis Showboats of the United States Football League (USFL). He played college football at Duke.

Professional career

Los Angeles Chargers
Helm was signed by the Los Angeles Chargers as an undrafted free agent on April 27, 2019. He was waived by the Chargers on August 1, 2019.

San Francisco 49ers (first stint)
Helm was claimed off waivers by the San Francisco 49ers on August 2, 2019. He was waived on August 31, 2019, during final roster cuts and was re-signed to the 49ers practice squad the following day. Helm was promoted to the 49ers active roster on December 12, 2019, following an injury to Garrett Celek, but did not play in any games. Helm was waived by the 49ers on August 15, 2020.

Kansas City Chiefs
Helm was claimed off waivers by the Kansas City Chiefs on August 16, 2020. He was waived by the Chiefs on September 5, 2020.

Tampa Bay Buccaneers
Helm was signed to the Tampa Bay Buccaneers' practice squad on September 22, 2020.

San Francisco 49ers (second stint)
Helm was signed off the Buccaneers practice squad by the 49ers on September 29, 2020. He made his NFL debut on October 18, 2020, against the Los Angeles Rams. Helm was waived on October 20, 2020, and was signed to the practice squad the next day. He was elevated to the active roster on November 5 and November 14 for the team's weeks 9 and 10 games against the Green Bay Packers and New Orleans Saints, and reverted to the practice squad after each game. He was placed on the practice squad/COVID-19 list by the team on November 20, and restored to the practice squad and subsequently released on December 3. He was re-signed to the practice squad on December 9. He was elevated to the active roster again on December 19 and December 25 for the weeks 15 and 16 games against the Dallas Cowboys and Arizona Cardinals, and reverted to the practice squad after each game. His practice squad contract with the team expired after the season on January 11, 2021. He was re-signed on March 17, 2021. On June 1, 2021, Helm was waived by 49ers.

Las Vegas Raiders
On October 25, 2021, Helm was signed to the Las Vegas Raiders active roster. He was released on January 8, 2022.

Atlanta Falcons
On January 20, 2022, Helm signed a reserve/future contract with the Atlanta Falcons. He was waived on May 16, 2022.

Memphis Showboats
Helm signed with the Memphis Showboats of the USFL on January 5, 2023.

References

External links
San Francisco 49ers bio
Duke Blue Devils bio

1995 births
Living people
American football tight ends
Players of American football from Illinois
Duke Blue Devils football players
San Francisco 49ers players
Los Angeles Chargers players
People from Sangamon County, Illinois
Tampa Bay Buccaneers players
Kansas City Chiefs players
Las Vegas Raiders players
Atlanta Falcons players